The Portsmouth line is a secondary main line originally built by the London, Brighton and South Coast Railway and the London and South Western Railway between 1847 and 1868.

As of 2022, the line is predominantly a commuter line and there are no scheduled services running along the entire route. The current service pattern can be divided into three sections.

Names
The Portsmouth line refers to the preferred route from London to Portsmouth on the former LB&SCR system, and particularly the cutoff from Peckham Rye to Horsham. It is not generally applied north of Peckham Rye or south of Horsham because those lines have well-known identities established before the Portsmouth connection was completed: the South London Line, the Mid-Sussex Line and the West Coastway Line.

For a time passenger services on the Portsmouth line and some associated branches were timetabled and marketed as the Sutton & Mole Valley Lines.  Since 2007 that name no longer appears in Southern or National Rail publications.

The Portsmouth Line should not be confused with the Portsmouth Direct Line (originally called the "Direct Portsmouth Railway"). The Portsmouth Direct, before the Grouping part of the LSWR system, has been the primary route from London to Portsmouth since it opened. From Havant to  it shares the LBSCR route.

From Portcreek Junction to Portsmouth the route was owned and operated jointly by the LBSCR and LSWR, and that section is known as the Portsmouth Joint Line.

History 
Early railways to Portsmouth were far from direct. Surprisingly over such a distance the two routes from London were almost identical in length, the Brighton route being shorter by just 51 chains (94m 43ch from London Bridge via Brighton, vs. 95m 14ch from Waterloo via Eastleigh).

For a decade these remained the only lines into Portsmouth. The people of Portsmouth and particularly the Admiralty thought such roundabout routes were unsatisfactory for a major naval base, especially when the rival port of Southampton, and Brighton, a mere seaside resort, were served by fast direct lines from London. Various schemes were proposed for shorter lines, including routes via Horsham and via the Wey Valley.  The eventual winner was the Direct Portsmouth Railway, authorised in 1853 and opened in 1858. This extended the LSWR Godalming branch to meet the LBSCR West Coastway at Havant. It was operated and later acquired by the LSWR, and quickly became the most popular route to Portsmouth, despite initial obstructive tactics by the LBSCR at Havant.

This put the LBSCR at a disadvantage, but over the following decade they developed a number of lines in Surrey and West Sussex that substantially improved their Portsmouth service.

Thus the route that eventually became the Portsmouth Line was built in stages over an extended period:

Along The North Downs

Arrival at Epsom
Sutton and Epsom were first reached by an extension of the London and Croydon Railway (L&CR) from West Croydon.  This was promoted by the L&CR as an independent company, the Croydon and Epsom Railway (C&ER), and was originally proposed to be an atmospheric railway.

In 1846 the C&ER merged with the L&CR, the London & Brighton Railway and others to form the LBSCR, and in 1847 the Croydon and Epsom route was completed as a conventional locomotive-hauled line under LBSCR auspices.  It ran via Wallington, Sutton, Cheam and Ewell to an Epsom station on the east side of town.

Extending to Leatherhead
Twelve years later the independent Epsom and Leatherhead Railway (ELR) built a line from a new station on the west side of Epsom to Leatherhead, opening in February 1859 as single line with just one intermediate station, at Ashtead.  The LSWR-promoted Wimbledon and Dorking Railway connected end-on at Epsom, opening in April 1859.  On 8 Aug 1859 the LBSCR opened an extension from its existing Epsom station to the ELR.  Within a year the ELR was jointly acquired by the LSWR and LBSCR.

Avoiding Brighton

Horsham and The Arun Valley
A single-line branch from the Brighton Main Line at Three Bridges to Horsham, later known as the Mid-Sussex Line, had opened in 1848.  It was extended down the Arun Valley to Petworth via Pulborough in 1859 (eventually reaching Midhurst in 1866).  In 1862 it was doubled throughout, and the following year it was extended from Hardham Junction, south of Pulborough, to Arundel Junction on the West Coastway Line.  This, in 1863, gave the LBSCR a more direct path from London to Chichester and Portsmouth than the long detour via Brighton, although it followed two-thirds of the Brighton Main Line before turning cross-country.

The Mole Valley: Leatherhead to Horsham
In 1862 the Horsham, Dorking and Leatherhead Railway (HDLR) was authorised to provide a link from the Mid-Sussex Line at Horsham to Leatherhead, crossing the North Downs via the Mole Valley between Dorking and Leatherhead. The line connected to the ELR at Leatherhead, just east of the existing station. At Dorking there was a south-to-west spur to the South Eastern Railway's Reading, Guildford and Reigate Railway, but this was never used for regular services.

The Sutton cutoff
Although it primarily filled gaps in the LBSCR suburban network it also improved the route to Portsmouth, being slightly shorter than via Wallington, and bypassed the bottlenecks at Norwood Junction and Selhurst; so it was promoted as a new "Portsmouth Line".

Contemporary maps label it the "South London & Sutton Junction Railway" suggesting that, as with other sections of the Portsmouth Line, this part may initially have been vested in an independent company to insulate the LBSCR from financial problems; although there is no evidence that they used such a vehicle for either construction or operation of the line.

Connections

On opening in 1868 the Sutton line had many links, all but one to other LBSCR lines:
 Chords from Tulse Hill up to the Crystal Palace Line in both directions
 The Brighton Main Line junctions at Streatham:
 a double-track SW to SE chord from Streatham (Streatham Junction) down to the Slow Lines at 
 a double-track flying junction SE to SW from the Slow Lines (Streatham North Junction) to the Portsmouth (Streatham South Junction)
 a separate single-track chord with crossovers up from the Fast Lines
 The Wimbledon Loop branching off west at Streatham South Junction
 Crossing the Wimbledon and Croydon Railway at Mitcham Junction, a new station created specifically for this interchange
 At Sutton the line from West Croydon via Wallington joins in a trailing direction, and the Epsom Downs Branch turns away to the south

Engineering
The section from Peckham Rye to Streatham passes through the grounds of Dulwich College and relatively hilly terrain, which required some costly engineering works:
 A brick-lined cutting leading to  station
 An ornate brick-arch viaduct through the College grounds, with several cast-iron road overbridges
 Knights Hill Tunnel
 Leigham Tunnel
 Streatham Tunnel
The arches of the viaduct and the south portal of Knight's Hill Tunnel are adorned with the monogram "AC", in tribute to the landowner Alleyn's College, as Dulwich College was known at the time the line was built.

Mitcham Junction station is approached from both directions by severe curves that turn the Portsmouth Line through 90-degrees to join the alignment of the Wimbledon-Croydon line (running NW-SE), then back to resume its broadly SW alignment.

Later Connections

This included a branch from  via  to the Portsmouth Line at Leatherhead. This turned the old LSWR terminal at Leatherhead into a through station, and enabled a "Guildford via Epsom" service which continues to this day.

After the Grouping, in 1927 the Southern Railway diverted the Bookham line to join the HDLR to the west of the LBSCR station, which then became the only Leatherhead station.  A stump of the original ELR/LSWR line was retained for carriage sidings.

Also in 1927 the Southern Railway completely rebuilt Epsom LSWR station and layout to give the LBSCR (Sutton) line access to the platforms.  Epsom Town was closed to passengers in 1929, and became the main goods station for the area, relieving the cramped yard at Epsom (LSWR).

One of the last new lines to be built in Britain before the HS1 era was the Wimbledon and Sutton Railway (W&SR), from Wimbledon through Merton and Morden, to join the Portsmouth Line in the up direction south of Sutton.  Construction began in 1927 and was completed in 1930.  The Wimbledon & Sutton line is now part of a circular route from Streatham, via the Portsmouth Line to Sutton, the W&SR to Wimbledon, then the Wimbledon Loop (northern branch) back to Streatham.

Technical information

Tunnels 
There are five tunnels, built between 1860 and 1867:

The southern portal is framed by pilasters on each of which are two ball finials (stone spheres); it can be seen from Tulse Hill station. The northern portal, which is hidden in a cutting, is quite plain.

It is on a curve and most unusual in that the southern portal is a skewed arch, with decorative details including massive stone capping, dentils and panelled brickwork.

Restrictions imposed by the landowner, Thomas Grissell, meant that vertical ventilation shafts could not be constructed. The tunnel portals were given lavish architectural treatment.

It runs through the upper greensand of the Deepdene Ridge to the east of the town. Construction difficulties delayed the opening south of Dorking. It collapsed on 27 July 1887, remaining closed for over six months.

Viaducts
The viaduct across the grounds of Dulwich College already mentioned includes some decorated cast-iron underbridges: West Dulwich, Croxted Road Bridge (image 5).

Between Leatherhead and Dorking are a number of brick-arch viaducts over the River Mole, not as elaborate as the Dulwich viaduct but still notable: River Mole viaducts, images 3-5.  Mickleham Tunnel exits directly onto one of them.

Sectional References

The Portsmouth Line is most of the Line of Route (LOR) SO680, Bermondsey Junction to Horsham, although that also includes part of what was historically known as the South London Line, from South Bermondsey to Peckham Rye.

Because of the fragmentary origins of the Portsmouth Line, for engineering purposes it comprises several distinct sections with different mileage origins.  Corresponding to LOR SO680 is the Engineer's Line Reference (ELR) BTH ("Bermondsey to Horsham"), which is divided into 3 sections with mileage breaks at Sutton and Epsom.

The route from the two LBSCR London termini to Portsmouth uses various other ELRs.  The following table describes the complete routes from London Bridge and Victoria to Portsmouth Harbour, with the Portsmouth Line itself highlighted in blue

Services 

From the 1870s the LBSCR operated Portsmouth services over this line (as well as the Mid-Sussex route) in competition with the LSWR Portsmouth Direct Line.  At over 11 miles longer (85m 72ch from Victoria vs. 74m 24ch from Waterloo) it could not compete for the principal London to Portsmouth traffic, but it maintained a viable existence providing a Portsmouth and South Coast service for intermediate stations and the many branch connections.  It was also used for services from London to Littlehampton and Bognor, including dividing trains and slip-coaches.

After the Grouping the Southern Railway concluded that there was no longer a need for competing routes to Portsmouth and in 1924 withdrew the fast service from Victoria.  There was a public outcry, prompting wider criticism of SR services and leading to the appointment for the first time of a "Public Relations" manager.  Within a year the SR reinstated the Victoria to Portsmouth expresses.

The Portsmouth Line was still used by fast & semi-fast trains from Victoria and London Bridge to Portsmouth after nationalisation.  Then in 1978 to meet growing demand at  those services were re-routed via the Brighton Main Line to Three Bridges then the Mid-Sussex Line, reverting to the service that operated between 1863 and 1867.

The Portsmouth Line is now used only for suburban services and occasional diversionary routing.  A representative (but not exhaustive) selection of services as of 2020 (weekday off-peak):

Southern
 London Bridge to East Croydon and beyond via Tulse Hill, Streatham and Selhurst
 London Bridge to Beckenham Junction via Tulse Hill and Crystal Palace
 Victoria to Dorking and Horsham via Mitcham Junction, Sutton and Epsom
Epsom Downs services usually run via Wallington and only interchange with the Portsmouth Line at Sutton.

South Western Railway
 Waterloo to Dorking via Epsom
 Waterloo to Guildford via Epsom

Thameslink
 Luton or St. Albans to Sutton via Wimbledon (Sutton Loop anti-clockwise)
 Luton or St. Albans to Sutton via Mitcham Junction (Sutton Loop clockwise)

Thameslink Sutton Loop services join the Portsmouth Line at Tulse Hill.  The Thameslink Peterborough to Horsham service runs via Three Bridges.

See also 
 South London Line

 Croydon and Epsom Railway

 Epsom and Leatherhead Railway
 Horsham, Dorking and Leatherhead Railway

 Arun Valley Line
 West Coastway Line
 Portsmouth and Ryde Joint Railway

Notes

References

External links 

Route Map and Timetable for Sutton & Mole Valley Line

Railway lines in England